Hasina Murshed was a Bengali politician, educationist, and Member of the Bengal Legislative Assembly.

Biography
Hasina Murshed was married to Syed Manzoor Murshed, they had a son Syed Tanweer Murshed. She was her husbands second wife, his first wife was a member of Dhaka Nawab family. Syed Tanweer Murshed was married to Yasmeen Murshed, who was also a member of Dhaka Nawab family. Hasina was elected to the Bengal Legislative Assembly of British India in 1937. She was the first women parliamentary secretary of Bengal. She was self-educated. She was one of the founders of Lady Brabourne College, the first college in Bengal for Muslim women. She sat in the governing body of Lady Brabourne College. She was awarded the Most Excellent Order of the British Empire (MBE) by the British Raj. She was a member of the Coalition Party. In the Bengal Legislative Assembly, she talked about the importance of women's education and called for the building of women's college and hostels.

References

Living people
Members of the Dhaka Nawab family
Bangladeshi women activists
Bangladeshi women in politics
Bengal MLAs 1937–1945
Year of birth missing (living people)